The 2016 CONCACAF Futsal Championship qualification was a men's futsal competition which decided the participating teams of the 2016 CONCACAF Futsal Championship.

A total of eight teams qualified to play in the final tournament, where the berths were allocated to the three regional zones as follows:
Two teams from the North American Zone (NAFU), including Mexico who qualified automatically
Three teams from the Central American Zone (UNCAF), including Costa Rica who qualified automatically as hosts
Two teams from the Caribbean Zone (CFU)
The final berth was allocated to the play-off winner between a team from the Central American Zone and a team from the Caribbean Zone

The top four teams of the final tournament qualified for the 2016 FIFA Futsal World Cup in Colombia.

Teams
A total of 18 CONCACAF member national teams entered the tournament. Among them, two teams qualified automatically for the final tournament, and 16 teams entered the regional qualifying competitions.

Notes
1 Non-FIFA member, ineligible for World Cup.

North American Zone
In the North American Zone, Mexico qualified automatically as the highest-placed North American team from the 2012 CONCACAF Futsal Championship. The remaining two teams from NAFU, Canada and the United States, played in a two-match aggregate-goals play-off in Costa Rica on 4 and 5 May 2016, with the winner qualifying for the final tournament.

Times UTC−6.

Canada won 9–7 on aggregate and qualified for 2016 CONCACAF Futsal Championship.

Central American Zone

In the Central American Zone, Costa Rica qualified automatically as hosts. The remaining six teams from UNCAF entered the qualifying competition, played in Guatemala between 27–31 January 2016.

The draw for the qualifying tournament was held on 12 January 2016 in Guatemala City. Guatemala and Panama, which qualified for the 2012 FIFA Futsal World Cup, were seeded into Groups A and B respectively. The other four teams were placed in two pots, with El Salvador and Honduras in Pot 1, and Belize and Nicaragua in Pot 2.

The six teams were drawn into two groups of three teams. The group winners and runners-up advanced to the semi-finals, with the semi-final winners playing in the final and the losers playing in the third-place play-off. The top two teams qualified for the final tournament as the UNCAF representatives besides hosts Costa Rica, while the third-placed team advanced to the play-off against the third-placed team from the Caribbean Zone.

Times UTC−6.

Group A

Group B

Semi-finals
Winners qualified for 2016 CONCACAF Futsal Championship.

Third place play-off
Winner advanced to Central American Zone–Caribbean Zone play-off.

Final

Caribbean Zone

In the Caribbean Zone, eight teams from CFU entered the qualifying competition, played in Cuba between 22–26 January 2016.

The eight teams were divided into two groups of four teams. The group winners played in the final and the runners-up played in the third-place play-off. The top two teams qualified for the final tournament as the CFU representatives, while the third-placed team advanced to the play-off against the third-placed team from the Central American Zone.

Times UTC−5.

Group 1

Group 2

Third place play-off
Winner advanced to Central American Zone–Caribbean Zone play-off.

Final

Central American Zone–Caribbean Zone play-off
Honduras (Central American Zone third place) and Trinidad and Tobago (Caribbean Zone third place) played in a two-match aggregate-goals play-off in Costa Rica on 4 and 5 May 2016, with the winner qualifying for the final tournament.

Times UTC−6.

Honduras won 6–4 on aggregate and qualified for 2016 CONCACAF Futsal Championship.

Qualified teams
The following eight teams qualified for the final tournament.

1 Bold indicates champion for that year. Italic indicates host for that year.

References

External links
Futsal, CONCACAF.com
Fútbol Masculino Futsal, UNCAFut.com 

2016 qualification
Concacaf qualification
2016 in futsal
Futsal qualification